The women's 20 kilometres walk competition of the athletics events at the 2019 Pan American Games took place on 4 August on a temporary circuit around the Parque Kennedy in Lima, Peru. The defending Pan American Games champion was Lupita González of Mexico.

Records

Schedule

Abbreviations
All times shown are in hours:minutes:seconds

Results

References

Athletics at the 2019 Pan American Games